Calumia is a genus of fishes in the family Eleotridae native to the marine waters of the Indian Ocean and the western Pacific Ocean.

Species
The recognized species in this genus are:
 Calumia eilperinae G. R. Allen & Erdmann, 2010
 Calumia godeffroyi (Günther, 1877) (tailface sleeper)
 Calumia papuensis G. R. Allen & Erdmann, 2010
 Calumia profunda Larson & Hoese, 1980

References

Eleotridae